William Fytche (1716 – 10 August 1753) was an administrator of the English East India Company. He served as President of Bengal in the mid-eighteenth century. He was one of the last administrators before the Battle of Plassey allowed the company to firmly establish its rule in India.

Biography
He became a member of the Calcutta council of merchants in 1746. In 1749 he went to Murshidabad, to take charge of the factory at Cossimbazaar there. He became President (Governor) on 8 January 1752. According to the Gentleman's Magazine in 1794, he had been in India for 21 years.

Family
Fytche married Lucia Beard on 25 February 1744 at Fort St George, Madras, where he was before being sent to Bengal. Their daughter Elizabeth was heir also to Fytche's brother Thomas, of Danbury Place, Essex; she married in 1775 Lewis Disney, who then changed his name to Lewis Disney Fytche.

Fytche died of dysentery at the age of 35. After Fytche's death Lucia married William McGuire, having a son and a daughter with him.

References

1716 births
1753 deaths
Presidents of Bengal
English businesspeople
Administrators in British India
18th-century British people